Sri Kailash (Hindi: श्री कैलाश) is a mountain in Uttarakhand, India, the 47th highest located entirely within India. Nanda Devi, is the highest mountain in this category. Sri Kailash 204th highest peak in the world. The summit is 6932 meter or 22744 feet. It is the fourth highest mountain in the Gangotri region. The three above peaks in this region are Chaukhamba (7134m), Satopanth (7075m), Kedarnath (6940m). It is situated at the head of The Raktvarn Glacier.

Climbing history

It was first climbed by a German expedition led by R. Schwarzgruber on 16 October 1938 by the west ridge. The climbers are Major Gordon Osmaston, Ellmauthaler, Frauenberger and Jonas. The first successful  Indian ascent of Sri Kailash was in 1963, led by D. Pandya. There were two unsuccessful attempts in 1977, Ranvir Singh led the Parvatarohi of Bombay and the other led by Vijay Mahajan of Giri-Bhraman Pune.

Neighboring peaks
Sri Kailash neighboring or subsidiary peaks:
 Pilapani Parbat, 6,796 m (22,297 ft), prominence = 690 m 
 Sudarshan Parbat, 6,507 m (21,348 ft), 
 Mana Parbat I, 6,794 m (22178 ft)

Glaciers and rivers
The Raktvarn Glacier. that met with Gangotri Glacier from there emerge the Bhagirathi river.

See also
 List of Himalayan peaks of Uttarakhand

References

Mountains of Uttarakhand
Geography of Chamoli district
Six-thousanders of the Himalayas